Mario Kempe (born 19 September 1988) is a Swedish professional ice hockey right winger who is currently playing for Luleå HF of the Swedish Hockey League (SHL). He has formerly played in the National Hockey League (NHL) for the Arizona Coyotes.

Playing career
Kempe first started skating when he was five years old on an outdoor rink in his hometown of Kramfors. He represented Ångermanland twice in TV-pucken while playing for Modo Hockey's junior teams in Örnsköldsvik, Sweden. During the 2005–06 season, Kempe represented Team Sweden at the 2006 IIHF Under-18 World Championship.

That following summer, Kempe was drafted 31st overall in the 2006 CHL Import Draft by the St. John's Fog Devils of the QMJHL. Kempe made the trip to North America and cracked the Fog Devils lineup. He was named an assistant captain during his rookie season.

Kempe finished the season tied for 6th among QMJHL rookies in goals and 11th in points, and was voted "Fastest Skater in the Eastern Division".
Kempe was ranked 50th among North American prospects on Central Scouting's final report heading into the 2007 NHL Entry Draft. He was chosen in the 5th round, 122nd overall by the Philadelphia Flyers.

Kempe returned to his native Sweden after completing two seasons in the QMJHL. He signed with Rögle BK of Elitserien in the off-season and recorded two goals and eight assists in thirty games-played. After receiving limited ice time during the first half of the year he was traded to Mora IK of the second-highest level league in Sweden. He signed a two-year contract with Djurgården on 16 June 2010.

Following the 2016–17 campaign and after three seasons in the Kontinental Hockey League with HC Vityaz, Kempe left as a free agent and returned to North America in securing a one-year, two-way contract with the Arizona Coyotes of the National Hockey League (NHL) on 16 May 2017.

On 28 May 2018, he signed a one-year contract extension with the Coyotes.

On 5 July 2019, Kempe signed a one-year two-way contract with the Los Angeles Kings, joining brother Adrian. He was assigned to the Ontario Reign for the beginning of the 2019–20 season. Named as an alternate captain for the Reign, Kempe registered 3 goals and 11 points through 16 games in the AHL before he was placed on unconditional waivers by Kings in order for a mutual termination of his contract on 19 November 2019.

As a free agent, Kempe returned for a second stint in Russia and the KHL, agreeing to a two-year contract with reigning Gagarin Cup champions CSKA Moscow on 21 November 2019.

At the conclusion of his contract with CSKA, Kempe left the club and continued in the KHL with Belarusian outfit, HC Dinamo Minsk, on a one-year contract on 26 August 2021.

International play
On 9 May 2019, Kempe was named to make his senior international debut with Sweden at the 2019 World Championships held in Bratislava, Slovakia.

Personal life
Kempe's younger brother, Adrian, is currently playing for the Los Angeles Kings of the NHL. Mario is named after the Argentine former professional footballer Mario Kempes.

Career statistics

Regular season and playoffs

International

References

External links
 

1988 births
Arizona Coyotes players
HC CSKA Moscow players
HC Dinamo Minsk players
Djurgårdens IF Hockey players
Living people
Luleå HF players
Modo Hockey players
Mora IK players
Ontario Reign (AHL) players
People from Kramfors Municipality
Philadelphia Flyers draft picks
Philadelphia Phantoms players
Rögle BK players
St. John's Fog Devils players
Swedish ice hockey right wingers
Tucson Roadrunners players
HC Vityaz players
Sportspeople from Västernorrland County